Presidential elections were held in El Salvador in January 1911. Manuel Enrique Araujo was elected president through a popular election, receiving 182,964 votes. The election was rigged heavily in favor of Araujo, and as stated by White, "opponents were allowed to participate but not allowed to win".

Results

References

El Salvador
1911 in El Salvador
Election and referendum articles with incomplete results
Presidential elections in El Salvador
Single-candidate elections